Mangelia exstans is a species of sea snail, a marine gastropod mollusk in the family Mangeliidae.

This is a taxon inquirendum.

Description
The shell grows to a length of 2.5 mm, its diameter 1.3 mm.

Distribution
This marine species is found off East London, South Africa

References

Endemic fauna of South Africa
exstans
Gastropods described in 1958